Barrio Norte is a corregimiento in Colón District, Colón Province, Panama with a population of 20,579 as of 2010. Its population as of 1990 was 30,385; its population as of 2000 was 24,346.

References

Corregimientos of Colón Province